Steve Fryar (January 31, 1953 – January 10, 2017), was a professional rodeo cowboy.

College career
In 1977 he was the College National Finals Rodeo steer wrestling champion and southwestern regional champion for Tarleton State University. He graduated from Tarleton State University with a degree in agriculture.

Professional career
He had a 20-year professional career from 1975-1995 highlighted by a qualification to the 1980 National Finals Rodeo.

Personal life
His daughter, Stephanie Fryar, qualified for the 2008 National Finals Rodeo.

References

1953 births
2017 deaths
Steer wrestlers
Tarleton State University alumni